Son Chae-young (born April 23, 1999), known mononymously as Chaeyoung, is a South Korean rapper and singer. She is a member of the South Korean girl group Twice, formed by JYP Entertainment.

Early life
Chaeyoung was born in Seoul, South Korea on April 23, 1999. She took interest in performing arts from a young age and used to model for a children's magazine. Chaeyoung decided she wanted to become a singer before joining JYP Entertainment and took dance lessons for over one year.

Career

2015–present: Sixteen, Twice, and solo activities

Chaeyoung participated in the reality television competition Sixteen in 2015. Ranking sixth place out of the nine debut spots, she went on to join the newly formed girl group Twice as one of its  rappers and singers. On October 20, 2015, Twice officially debuted with the release of their first extended play (EP) The Story Begins.

Chaeyoung became the first member of the group to receive writing credits when she wrote a rap verse for Twice's version of J. Y. Park's "Precious Love" as part of their 2016 EP Page Two. Since then, Chaeyoung has participated in writing lyrics for multiple songs by Twice. For the group's second Japanese studio album &Twice, on the track "How U Doin'", Chaeyoung took part in composing for the first time, making her the first member to do so. She also designed the limited edition cover of Page Two and three different pairs of SPRIS shoes. As a soloist, Chaeyoung released a cover of "Alone" by Cheeze.

On Oct 22, 2021, Chaeyoung released a cover of “Off My Face" by Justin Bieber as part of the Melody Project series.

Personal life
Chaeyoung attended Hanlim Multi Art School with fellow bandmate Tzuyu, graduating in 2019. In 2020, Chaeyoung's personal phone number was leaked on social media; JYP Entertainment released a statement about the incident, and she responded directly on Twice's Instagram page.

She is Catholic and her baptismal name is Catarina (or Katarina).

Discography

Songwriting credits 
All song credits are adapted from the Korea Music Copyright Association's database unless stated otherwise.

Filmography

Television shows

Hosting

Bibliography

Photobooks

References

External links
 

1999 births
Living people
People from Seoul
Singers from Seoul
Rappers from Seoul
Twice (group) members
K-pop singers
JYP Entertainment artists
South Korean women rappers
South Korean women record producers
South Korean women pop singers
Japanese-language singers of South Korea
South Korean child singers
South Korean female idols
Hanlim Multi Art School alumni
21st-century South Korean women singers
English-language singers from South Korea
South Korean Roman Catholics